Jimmy Allan (29 June 1896 – 19 May 1982) was a Scottish football player and manager. He played for East Fife, Cowdenbeath and Falkirk, and managed Dundee United.

Early life
Jimmy Allan was born in Cowdenbeath, Fife in 1896.

Playing career
Allan played junior football for Glencraig Celtic before going on to a brief playing career with East Fife, Cowdenbeath and Falkirk. He also played for Dundee's reserve team as a trialist. A part-time footballer, Allan was also a professional sprinter.

Management career
He became Dundee United manager in 1939. In his nine months with the club, he led them to their first national final, reaching the Scottish War Emergency Cup final only to lose to Rangers. Allan resigned in July 1940 after the club closed for the 1940-41 season.

Honours

Manager

Dundee United
Emergency War Cup Runner-up: 1
 1939–40

References

1896 births
1982 deaths
People from Cowdenbeath
Scottish footballers
East Fife F.C. players
Cowdenbeath F.C. players
Falkirk F.C. players
Scottish football managers
Dundee United F.C. managers
Association football inside forwards
Footballers from Fife
Scottish male sprinters
Scottish Junior Football Association players
Glencraig Celtic F.C. players